Leo Kuper (20 November 1908 – 23 May 1994) was a South African sociologist specialising in the study of genocide.

Early life and legal career

Kuper was born to a Lithuanian Jewish family. His siblings included his sister Mary (d. 1948), who in later life directed the Johannesburg Legal Aid Bureau.

Kuper trained in law at the University of the Witwatersrand, receiving there his BA and LLB degrees. As a lawyer, he represented African clients in human-rights cases, and also represented one of the country's early non-segregated trade unions. He supported the establishment of South Africa's first legal aid charity.

Wartime service

Kuper served with the Eighth Army in Kenya, Egypt, and Italy, as an intelligence officer, from 1940 to 1946. After the war he organised the National War Memorial Health Foundation, which provided social and medical services for disadvantaged people from all backgrounds.

Scholarly and political activities

In 1947 Kuper went to the University of North Carolina, where he earned an M.A. in sociology. He was subsequently appointed Lecturer in Sociology at the University of Birmingham in England.

At Birmingham, Kuper directed a research project intended to help the city of Coventry recover from the bombing it received during World War II. This project culminated in the publication of Living in Towns (1953). Kuper completed a doctorate in sociology at the University of Birmingham in 1952, and moved to Durban, South Africa, as Professor of Sociology at the University of Natal.

Kuper was an active opponent of apartheid. Under his headship, the Sociology Department at the University of Natal was the only integrated academic department in South Africa. Kuper and his colleague Fatima Meer were subjected to surveillance by the apartheid government, and classes taught in the department were infiltrated by government spies, resulting in a chilling effect.

During his time in Durban, Kuper co-founded the Liberal Party of South Africa, and became chairman of its Natal branch. On 6 December 1956, Kuper and Alan Paton spoke on behalf of the Liberal Party at a fundraising event in Durban in aid of the Treason Trial defendants. They and four other speakers were arrested and charged under a segregationist statute, the Natal Provincial Notice No. 78 of 1933, accused of "holding, or attending, or participating in ... a meeting of natives". Of the ensuing trial, Paton recalled:

On 1 August 1957, all six defendants were acquitted on appeal.

During the 1960s, Kuper moved to Los Angeles, California, United States, where he took up teaching and researching at UCLA and was appointed professor of sociology. His publications include The Pity of it All, Passive Resistance in South Africa, and The Prevention of Genocide. His book Genocide: Its Political Use in the Twentieth Century (1981) was particularly widely cited.

Kuper was a founding member of the International Council of the Institute on the Holocaust and Genocide in Jerusalem. In the mid-1980s, he founded International Alert, with the support of Michael Young, Martin Ennals and others.

Personal life
In 1936, Kuper married anthropologist Hilda Beemer, with whom he had two daughters: the international human rights lawyer Dr Jenny Kuper and the painter and sculptor Mary Kuper.

Works

 
 Passive Resistance in South Africa by Leo Kuper (New Haven, Yale University Press, 1957, 256 p., 4 p. of plates : ill. ; 21 cm).

 
 
  Pp. xviii+ 452. 21s. paperback.

 
 
 
 
 
 
 
 
 Cases and Materials on Genocide by Leo Kuper Foundation Staff, Publisher: Routledge (/1859419291).
 Genocide Reader (Criminology) by Leo Kuper Foundation, Routledge Cavendish, 1 January 2007, 600 pages.
 "Blueprint for Living Together" in Leo Kuper, ed., Living in Towns, London, 1953.
 
  
 
 
 
 "Techniques. of Social Control in South Africa" by Leo Kuper, Listener 55, 31 May 1956, pp. 708.
 "Rights and riots in Natal" by Leo Kuper In Africa South, Vol.4, No.2, Jan–Mar 1960, pp. 20–26.
 "The Heightening of Racial Tension" by Leo Kuper, In The Heightening of Racial Tension, Vol.2, 1960, pp. 24–32.
 "Ethnic and Racial Pluralism: Some Aspects of Polarization and Depluralization." In Leo Kuper and MG. Smith, M.G. (Eds) Pluralism in Africa. Berkeley and Los
 "Racialism and Integration in South African Society" by Leo Kuper, In Racialism and Integration in South African Society, Vol.4, 1963, pp. 26–31.
 "The problem of violence in South Africa" by Leo Kuper, in Inquiry (Taylor & Francis), Vol.7 (1–4), 1964, pages 295–303.
 "Book Review: Caneville: The Social Structure of a South African Town. Pierre L. Van Den Berghe, Edna Miller" by Leo Kuper, In American Journal of Sociology, Vol.71 (1), 1965, pp. 115.
 "Neighbour on the Hearth." by Leo Kuper – Environmental Psychology: Man and His Physical Setting, edited by H. M. Proshansky, W. H. Ittelson and L. G. Rivlin, (New York: Holt, Rinehart & Winston, 1970).
 "Continuities and Discontinuities in Race Relations: Evolutionary or Revolutionary Change" by Leo Kuper in Cahiers d'études africaines ( published by EHESS ), Vol. 10, Cahier 39, 1970, pp. 361–383.
 
 "African Nationalism in South Africa, 1910–1964" by Leo Kuper in The Oxford History of South Africa, Vol. II, M. Wilson and L. Thompson (eds.), Oxford: Clarendon Press, 1971, pp. 424–476.
 
 
 "Book Review: Ethnicity and Resource Competition in Plural Societies. Leo A. Despres" by Leo Kuper, In American Journal of Sociology, Vol.82 (5), 1977, pp. 1146.
 "Types of Genocide and Mass Murder" by Leo Kuper, In Israel W. Charny (ed.) Toward the understanding and prevention of genocide: Proceedings of the International Conference on the Holocaust and Genocide. Boulder and London: Westview Press, 1984, pages 32–47. 
 
 "The Nazi Doctors: Medical Killing and the Psychology of Genocide.", by Robert Jay Lifton and by Leo Kuper, Political Science Quarterly, Vol.102 (1), March 1987, pp. 175.
 "In the Belly of the Beast: The Modern State as Mass Murderer" by Robin M. Williams, Leo Kuper, in Contemporary Sociology, Vol.16 (4), 1987, pp. 502.
 "Genocide and the Modern Age: Etiology and Case Studies of Mass Death" by Leo Kuper, Isidor Walliman, Michael N. Dobkowski, In Contemporary Sociology, Vol.17 (1), 1988, pp. 24.
 
 "Theological warrants for genocide: Judaism, Islam and Christianity" by Leo Kuper – Terrorism and Political Violence, Volume 2, Issue 3, 1990, pages 351–379.
  "On Jewish Disconnection from Other Genocides." by Leo Kuper – Internet on the Holocaust and Genocide, Issues 49–50, Special Section, 1990, p. 7.
 Revolution and Genocide: On the Origins of the Armenian Genocide and the Holocaust, 2nd edition by Robert Melson, Leo Kuper (Introduction), Leo Kuper (Foreword by)
 
 "The Genocidal State: An Overview", by Leo Kuper in Pierre L. van den Berghe, ed., State Violence and Ethnicity (Niwot, CO: University Press of Colorado), 1990, pp. 44.
 "The Roots of Evil: The Origins of Genocide and Other Group Violence." by Leo Kuper, Ervin Staub, In Contemporary Sociology, Vol.19 (5), 1990, pp. 683.
 "The Genocidal Mentality: Nazi Holocaust and Nuclear Threat" by Leo Kuper, Robert Jay Lifton, Erik Markusen, In Contemporary Sociology, Vol.20 (2), 1991, pp. 217.
 "Lethal Politics: Soviet Genocide and Mass Murder since 1917" by Leo Kuper, R. J. Rummel, In Contemporary Sociology, Vol.20 (3), 1991, pp. 433.
 "Reflections on the Prevention of Genocide," by Leo Kuper in Helen Fein (Ed.) Genocide Watch. New Haven, CT: Yale University Press, 1992, pp. 135–161.
 "Theoretical Issues relating to Genocide: Uses and Abuses" by Leo Kuper in G.J. Andreopoulos (ed.), Genocide: Conceptual and Historical Dimensions, University of Pennsylvania Press, Philadelphia, 1994, p. 31-46.

Notes and references

External links
Leo Kuper Foundation website ? 
Research biography and collection details
Collections archived by University of California

1908 births
1994 deaths
20th-century South African lawyers
Alumni of the University of Birmingham
Jewish South African anti-apartheid activists
Genocide education
Liberal Party of South Africa politicians
People from Johannesburg
South African emigrants to the United States
South African Jews
South African people of Lithuanian-Jewish descent
South African writers
University of California, Los Angeles faculty
White South African anti-apartheid activists